Hederson Alves Estefani (born 11 September 1991) is a Brazilian athlete competing primarily in the 400 metres and 400 m hurdles. He represented his country at the 2015 World Championships in Beijing without advancing from the first round.

International competitions

1Disqualified in the final

Personal bests
Outdoor
400 metres – 45.25 (São Paulo 2012)
400 metres hurdles – 49.40 (São Bernardo do Campo 2015)

References

External links

1991 births
Living people
Brazilian male sprinters
Brazilian male hurdlers
World Athletics Championships athletes for Brazil
Pan American Games athletes for Brazil
Athletes (track and field) at the 2015 Pan American Games
Place of birth missing (living people)
Athletes (track and field) at the 2016 Summer Olympics
Olympic athletes of Brazil
Athletes (track and field) at the 2018 South American Games
South American Games silver medalists for Brazil
South American Games medalists in athletics
Troféu Brasil de Atletismo winners
21st-century Brazilian people